Tony Robert Jakobson (born 17 December 1937) is an English former first-class cricketer.

Jakobson was born at Marylebone in December 1937. He was educated at Charterhouse School, before going up to University College, Oxford. While studying at Oxford, he played first-class cricket for Oxford University, making his debut against the Free Foresters at Oxford in 1960. He played first-class cricket for Oxford until 1961, making a total of fourteen appearances. Playing primarily as a right-arm fast-medium bowler, he took a total of 37 wickets in his fourteen first-class matches at an average of 32.00 and best figures of 5 for 61, which represented his only five wicket haul. As a batsman, he scored 112 runs with a high score of 20.

Jakobson later became a horse racing tipster at Newmarket, where he wrote the Pin Money column in the Newmarket Journal for nearly fifty years, before stepping down in May 2020.

References

External links

1937 births
Living people
People from Marylebone
People educated at Charterhouse School
Alumni of University College, Oxford
English cricketers
Oxford University cricketers